Carl Alexander Wendt (13 January 1923 – 2006) was a Norwegian police leader and civil servant.

He was born in Mandal, and took the cand.jur. degree in 1948. After spending the years 1967 to 1982 as chief of police in Sør-Varanger, Bodø and Stavanger, he served as Governor of Svalbard from 1982 to 1985 and chief of police in Stavanger from 1986 to 1988.

References

Norwegian police chiefs
Governors of Svalbard
People from Mandal, Norway
1923 births
2006 deaths